The Łódź Voivodeship, also known as the Lodz Province, (Polish: Województwo łódzkie ) is a voivodeship (province) of Poland. It was created on 1 January 1999 out of the former Łódź Voivodeship (1975–1999) and the Sieradz, Piotrków Trybunalski and Skierniewice Voivodeships and part of Płock Voivodeship, pursuant to the Polish local government reforms adopted in 1998. The province is named after its capital and largest city, Łódź, pronounced .

Łódź Voivodeship is bordered by six other voivodeships: Masovian to the north and east, Świętokrzyskie to the south-east, Silesian to the south, Opole to the south-west, Greater Poland to the west, and Kuyavian-Pomeranian for a short stretch to the north. Its territory belongs to three historical provinces of Poland – Masovia (in the east), Greater Poland (in the west) and Lesser Poland (in the southeast, around Opoczno).

Cities and towns 
The voivodeship contains 11 cities and 35 towns. These are listed below in descending order of population (according to official figures for 31 December 2021):

Administrative division 

Łódź Voivodeship is divided into 24 counties (powiats): 3 city counties and 21 land counties. These are further divided into 177 gminas.

The counties are listed in the following table (ordering within categories is by decreasing population).

Protected areas

Protected areas in Łódź Voivodeship include seven Landscape Parks, as listed below.
Bolimów Landscape Park (partly in Masovian Voivodeship)
Łódź Hills Landscape Park
Przedbórz Landscape Park (partly in Świętokrzyskie Voivodeship)
Spała Landscape Park
Sulejów Landscape Park
Warta-Widawka Landscape Park
Załęcze Landscape Park (partly in Silesian Voivodeship)

Economy 
The Gross domestic product (GDP) of the province was 26.7 billion euros in 2018, accounting for 6.0% of Polish economic output. GDP per capita adjusted for purchasing power was 19,800 euros or 66% of the EU27 average in the same year. The GDP per employee was also 66% of the EU average.

History

The capital of the Łódź Voivodeship has always been Łódź, but the area of land which it comprises has changed several times. The first was a unit of administrative division and local government in the Second Polish Republic in the years 1921–1939. In 1938 some western counties were ceded to Greater Poland Voivodeship (see: Territorial changes of Polish Voivodeships on April 1, 1938).

It consisted of 15 powiats (counties):
 Brzeziny county,
 Końskie county,
 Kutno county,
 Łask county,
 Łęczyca county,
 Łowicz county,
 city of Łódź county (powiat łódzki grodzki),
 Łódź county,
 Opoczno county,
 Piotrków Trybunalski county,
 Radomsko county,
 Rawa Mazowiecka county,
 Sieradz county,
 Skierniewice county,
 Wieluń county.

The largest cities of the voivodeship were (population according to the 1931 census):
 Łódź (pop. 604,600),
 Piotrków Trybunalski (pop. 51,300),
 Pabianice (pop. 45,700),
 Tomaszów Mazowiecki (pop. 38,000),
 Zgierz (pop. 26,600),
 Kutno (pop. 23,400),
 Radomsko (pop. 23,000).

Source: Mały rocznik statystyczny 1939, Nakładem Glownego Urzędu Statystycznego, Warszawa 1939 (Concise Statistical Year-Book of Poland, Warsaw 1939).

The next incarnation existed from 1945 until 1975 (although the city of Łódź was excluded as a separate City Voivodeship). This Łódź Voivodeship was then broken up, superseded by Łódź (see below), Sieradz, Piotrków Trybunalski, Skierniewice and partly Płock Voivodeships.

Łódź Voivodeship, also known as Łódź Metropolitan Voivodeship (województwo miejskie łódzkie), existed from 1975 until 1998, after which it was incorporated into today's Łódź Voivodeship. Until 1990, the mayor of the city of Łódź was also the voivodeship governor.

As of 1995, major cities and towns in Łódź Metropolitan Voivodeship included (with their 1995 populations):
 Łódź (825,600);
 Pabianice (75,700);
 Zgierz (59,100);
 Ozorków (21,900);
 Aleksandrów Łódzki (20,400).

Culture and education

The basic cultural activities in the Łódź Region are: monitoring activities of seven regional self-government cultural institutions, i.e., the Arthur Rubinstein Łódź Philharmonic, Museum of Art in Łódź (having one of the biggest modern art collections in Europe), the Opera House, Stefan Jaracz Theater, the Museum of Archeology and Ethnography, the Józef Piłsudski Regional and Municipal Public Library in Łódź, the Chamber of Culture in Łódź but also: supporting NGO’s, protection of monuments, awarding scholarships to young artists and rewards for the prominent artists. What is more, infrastructural projects are being undertaken. Among the most important investments are: the creation of four regional scenes in Stefan Jaracz Theatre, opening the new section of the Museum of Art in Łódź - ms² or the reconstruction of medieval settlement in Tum in the vicinity of Łęczyca.

As of 2020, there were 76,897 students in various institutions of higher education in Łódź Voivodeship. The major universities in the voivodeship are:
University of Łódź
Lodz University of Technology
National Film School in Łódź
Medical University of Łódź
Higher School of National Economy in Kutno
Academy of Fine Arts In Łódź
Jan Kochanowski University in Piotrków Trybunalski

The excellent scientific staff of the higher education establishments in Łódź is complemented by Łódź’s scientists from the Institute of the Polish Academy of Sciences (PAN) and scientific ministerial institutes working within the field of the occupational medicine, textile, paper and leather industries.

References

External links

 Województwo Łódzkie Official website
 www.lodzkie.travel – tourists attractions of łódź voivodeship, a website produced by the Regional Tourist Organisation of the Łódź Voivodeship

 
States and territories established in 1999